is a Japanese manga series written and illustrated by Hyte Torishima. It was serialized in Shogakukan's seinen manga magazine Big Comic Superior from January to May 2018, with its chapters collected in a single tankōbon volume.

Characters

Media

Manga
Written and illustrated by Hyte Torishima, Kono Koi wa Tsumi nano ka!? was serialized in Shogakukan's seinen manga magazine Big Comic Superior from January 12 to May 25, 2018. Shogakukan collected its chapters in a single tankōbon volume, released on June 29, 2018.

Drama
A four-episode television drama adaptation was broadcast in Japan on MBS and TBS's Dramaism programming block from December 3–24, 2018.

Notes

References

External links
 
 

Mainichi Broadcasting System original programming
Seinen manga
Shogakukan manga
TBS Television (Japan) dramas